Hyalocystis is a genus of flowering plants belonging to the family Convolvulaceae.

Its native range is Northeastern Tropical Africa.

Species:

Hyalocystis popovii 
Hyalocystis viscosa

References

Convolvulaceae
Convolvulaceae genera